William Forrest (October 10, 1902 – January 26, 1989) was an American theatre, film, and television actor.

Biography
Forest attended Princeton University, where he was a star in athletics. His acting career began in 1938 at the Pasadena Playhouse, and he appeared in more than 250 films between 1939 and 1977. He was born in Cambridge, Massachusetts, and died in Santa Monica, California, from heart failure.

Partial filmography

 The Green Hornet Strikes Again (1940)
 The Lone Wolf Meets a Lady (1940)
The Secret Seven (1940)
 The Lone Wolf Takes a Chance (1941)
 Keep 'Em Flying (1941)
 Of Pups and Puzzles (1941) (short)
 Daring Young Man (1942)
 Tarzan's New York Adventure (1942)
 Yankee Doodle Dandy (1942) as 1st Critic (uncredited)
 The Masked Marvel (1943)
 Good Morning, Judge (1943)
 The Fighting Seabees (1944)
 Adventures of Kitty O'Day (1945)
 Girls of the Big House (1945)
 Gangs of the Waterfront (1945)
 The Caribbean Mystery (1945) as Colonel Lane
 Blind Spot (1947)
 Devil Ship (1947)
 The Devil on Wheels (1947)
 Dead Reckoning (1947) as Lt. Col. Simpson (uncredited)
  Miracle on 34th Street(1947) as Doctor Roger at Bellevue 
 Trail of the Yukon (1949) as Banker John Dawson
 The Story of Seabiscuit (1949) as Thomas Milford
 Follow the Sun (1951)
 Jet Job (1952)
 Band of Angels (1957) as Aaron Starr (uncredited)
 Jailhouse Rock (1957) as Studio Head (uncredited)
 The Last Hurrah (1958)
 Billy the Kid vs. Dracula'' (1966)

References

External links

1902 births
1989 deaths
American male film actors
American male television actors
American male stage actors
Male actors from Cambridge, Massachusetts
20th-century American male actors